Simeis 147, also known as the Spaghetti Nebula, SNR G180.0-01.7 or Sharpless 2-240, is a supernova remnant (SNR) in the Milky Way, straddling the border between the constellations Auriga and Taurus. It was discovered in 1952 at the Crimean Astrophysical Observatory by Grigory Shajn and his team using a Schmidt camera and a narrowband filter close to the Hydrogen Alpha transmission line. It is difficult to observe due to its extremely low brightness. This discovery was part of a survey conducted between 1945 and 1955, most likely using captured German equipment, as the observatory was practically destroyed during WWII. The Schmidt camera had a field of view of 175'. Many previously unknown hydrogen nebula were discovered this way, as they are not readily visible in regular photographs. 

The nebulous area has an almost spherical shell and a filamentary structure. The remnant has an apparent diameter of approximately 3 degrees, an estimated distance of approximately 3000 (±350) light-years, and an age of approximately 40,000 years. At that distance, it spans roughly 160 lightyears.

It is believed that the stellar explosion left behind a rapidly spinning neutron star known as pulsar PSR J0538+2817 in the nebula core, emitting a strong radio signal.

References

External links 
 VizieR Query
 SIMBAD Query
  APOD NASA 2016 April 25
  APOD NASA 2017 May 18
 Reference for amateur astronomers, P.G.Kulikovskii, 1971, p167. 

Taurus (constellation)
Supernova remnants
Sharpless objects
Astronomical objects discovered in 1952